Earl Harold Juul (May 21, 1893  January 4, 1942) was a professional baseball player who was pitcher for the  Brooklyn Tip-Tops of the Federal League in 1914.  It was his only season at the Major League Baseball. He pitched in nine games, throwing 29 innings, with an ERA of 6.21.

He died in Proviso Township, Cook County, Illinois and was interred at Mount Olive Cemetery.

References

Major League Baseball pitchers
Brooklyn Tip-Tops players
1893 births
1942 deaths
Baseball players from Chicago
Cleveland Green Sox players